Helen Louise Gardner (September 2, 1884 – November 20, 1968) was an American stage and film actress, screenwriter, film producer and costume designer.

Career
Gardner was born in Binghamton, New York. An alumna of the American Academy of Dramatic Arts, Gardner began her acting career as a stage actress. She became a Vitagraph Studios player in 1910 and earned critical acclaim for portraying Becky Sharp in the film version of the novel Vanity Fair. In 1912, she became the first film actor, male or female, to form her own production company,
The Helen Gardner Picture Players. The company was established in Tappan, New York with capital provided by Gardner’s mother. Gardner hired her lover Charles L. Gaskill as a director and scenarist. Known for her portrayal of strong female characters, Gardner’s first production was Cleopatra (1912), one of the first American full-length films. The film was re-edited and re-released after Fox released the 1917 adaptation starring Theda Bara. Gardner is considered the screen's first vamp, predating Theda Bara, Valeska Suratt and Louise Glaum. Gardner produced eleven feature films before closing her studio in 1914.

In 1915, she returned to Vitagraph briefly before signing with Universal. By this time, her popularity began to wane and she retired from acting in 1924.

Personal life
Before Gardner embarked on an acting career, she  married socially prominent businessman Duncan Clarkson Pell, Sr., on October 16, 1902, in West Haven, Connecticut. The marriage took place shortly after Gardner's 18th birthday and one week after Pell's divorce from his first wife, Anna. Duncan and Anna Pell's divorce was covered in the gossip columns of The New York Times. The couple had one child in 1904. Gardner left Pell in 1906 to continue her acting career but they never divorced. They remained married until Pell's death in 1964.

Some sources state that Gardner married for a second time to Charles Gaskill, the director of many of her films. Gardner's granddaughter and biographer, Dorin Gardner Schumacher, states that this is incorrect and that Gardner never divorced Duncan C. Pell, Sr.

Later years and death
In the 1950s, Gardner returned to Orlando, Florida where she had previously lived with her estranged husband. Gardner died in Orlando on November 20, 1968, at the age of 84.

Selected filmography

References

External links

 
 Helen Gardner at Women Film Pioneers Project
 
 Helengardner.org

1884 births
1968 deaths
20th-century American actresses
Actresses from New York (state)
American Academy of Dramatic Arts alumni
American film actresses
American costume designers
Women costume designers
Film producers from New York (state)
Screenwriters from New York (state)
American silent film actresses
American stage actresses
Actors from Binghamton, New York
American women screenwriters
People from Tappan, New York
Artists from Binghamton, New York
Women film pioneers
American women film producers
20th-century American women writers
20th-century American screenwriters
Pell family